Richard Kerr Murphy (6 August 1927 – 30 January 2018) was an Anglo-Irish poet.

Biography

Early years
Murphy was born to an Anglo-Irish family at Milford House, near the Mayo-Galway border, in 1927. He spent much of his early childhood in Ceylon (now Sri Lanka) where his father William Lindsay Murphy served in the Colonial Service and was active as mayor of Colombo, later becoming Governor General of the Bahamas (in succession to the Duke of Windsor). Murphy received his education at the King's School, Canterbury and Wellington College. He won a scholarship to Magdalen College, Oxford at the age of 17, where he studied English under C.S. Lewis. He was later educated at the Sorbonne, and ran a school in Crete between 1953 and 1954. In his Archaeology of Love (1955), Murphy reflects on his experiences in England and Continental Europe.

His childhood in Ireland was documented in the film The Other Irish Travellers, made by his niece Fiona Murphy.

Return to Ireland
In 1954, he settled at Cleggan, on the coast of Galway. Several years later, in 1959, he purchased and renovated the Ave Maria, a traditional hooker-type boat, from Inishbofin fisherman, Michael Schofield, which he used to ferry visitors to the island. He purchased Ardoileán (High Island), a small island in the vicinity of Inishbofin, in 1969.

Personal life
Murphy married Patsy Strang. From 1971, he was a poet-in-residence at nine American universities, in Princeton turning his office also into his bedroom, Joyce Carol Oates writing a short story about this. In later years he lived in Sri Lanka, having previously divided his time between Durban, South Africa, where his daughter and her family reside, and Dublin. He was the maternal grandfather of YouTuber Caspar Lee. A memoir of his life and times, The Kick, was published by Granta in 2002, constructed from detailed diaries kept over the course of five decades.

Murphy died at his Sri Lanka home on 30 January 2018.

Awards and honours
AE Memorial Award for Poetry, 1951
First prize, Guinness Awards, 1962
British Arts Council Award, 1967 and 1976
Irish Arts Council Award (Marten Toonder), 1980
Fellow of the Royal Society of Literature, 1969
Member of Aosdána, Ireland, 1982
American Irish Foundation Literary Award, 1983
Included in the Oxford Companion to English Literature, 1985
Poetry Book Society Translation Award, London, 1989
Society of Authors Foundation Award, 2002

Bibliography
His poetry collections include: 
The Archaeology of Love (Dolmen, 1955)
Sailing to an Island (Faber, 1963)
The Battle of Aughrim (Knopf and Faber, 1968; LP recording 1969)
High Island (Faber, 1974)
High Island: New and Selected Poems (Harper and Row, 1975)
Selected Poems (Faber, 1979)
The Price of Stone (Faber, 1985)
The Price of Stone and Earlier Poems (Wake Forest University Press, Winston-Salem, 1985)
New Selected Poems (Faber, 1989)
The Mirror Wall (Bloodaxe Books, Newcastle upon Tyne, 1989; Wolfhound Press, Dublin, 1989, Wake Forest U. Press, 1989)
The Mayo Anthology (editor; Mayo County Council, 1990) 
In The Heart Of The Country: Collected Poems (Oldcastle, Co. Meath, Gallery Press, 2000)
Collected Poems (Wake Forest University Press, Winston-Salem, 2001)
The Pleasure Ground: Poems 1952–2012 (Bloodaxe Books, Tarset, 2013; Lilliput Press, Dublin, 2012)

Memoirs:
The Kick. A Life among Writers (Granta, 2002)

Interviews:
Richard Murphy – reflections and stories of Seamus Heaney http://www.radionz.co.nz/national/programmes/labourday/audio/2574295/richard-murphy-reflections-and-stories-of-seamus-heaney
Radio New Zealand interview with Richard Murphy following the death of Seamus Heaney in 2013.
Interview with Richard Murphy: An old spectator hand http://blogs.spectator.co.uk/books/2013/09/interview-with-a-poet-richard-murphy-an-old-spectator-hand/

See also
Members of Aosdána

Notes

Secondary sources

Further reading

Books

Bowers, Neal (1982). "Richard Murphy: The Landscape of the Mind". Journal of Irish Literature 11.3: 33–42.
Harmon, Maurice (ed.) (1978). Richard Murphy: Poet of Two Traditions. Dublin: Wolfhound.

Journal Articles
 Boey, Kim Cheng. “Sailing To An Island: Contemporary Irish Poetry visits the Western Isles.” Shima: The International Journal for Research into Island Cultures 2 (2008): 19–41.
 Dewsnap, Terence. “Richard Murphy's ‘Apologia’: The Price of Stone.” The Canadian Journal of Irish Studies 22 (1996): 71–86.
 Heaney, Seamus. “The Poetry of Richard Murphy.” Irish University Review 7 (1977): 18–30.
 Kiberd, Declan. “Richard Murphy and Casement’s Funeral.” Metre 10 (2001): 135–137. http://metre.ff.cuni.cz/article/618
 Kinsella, Thomas. “For Richard Murphy.” Metre 10 (2001): 128. http://metre.ff.cuni.cz/article/89
 Meihuzen, Elsa. “Richard Murphy: A life in Writing.” Literator 27 (2006): 157–174.
 Merrill, Christopher. “Nature’s Discipline.” Metre 7/8 (2000): 210–213, http://metre.ff.cuni.cz/content/13.
 Murphy, Richard and Kelly, Shirley. “The Ambition to Write a Poem is Enough to Kill It.” Books Ireland 250 (2002): 151–152.
 O’Donoghue, Bernard. “The Lost Link: Richard Murphy’s Early Poetry” Metre 10 (2001): 138–140. http://metre.ff.cuni.cz/article/92
 Sendry, Joseph. “The Poet as Builder: Richard Murphy’s “The Price of Stone”.” Irish University Review 15 (1985): 38–49. 
 Siddall, Jill. “Grotesquely Free, Though Ruled By Symmetry.” Metre 10 (2001): 129–134, http://metre.ff.cuni.cz/article/96
 Swann, Joseph. “The Historian, the Critic and the Poet: A Reading of Richard Murphy’s Poetry and Some Questions of Theory.” The Canadian Journal of Irish Studies 16 (1990): 33–47.
 Torchiana, Donald T. “Contemporary Irish Poetry”. Chicago Review 17 (1964): 152–168.
 Young, Vernon. “The Body of Man” The Hudson Review 28 (1975–1976): 585–600.

Book Reviews

 Dawe, Gerald. “In the heart of the country: A review of Richard Murphy’s Collected Poems” The Irish Times, 10 November 2002. 
 Deane, Seamus. “The Appetites of Gravity – Contemporary Irish Poetry: Wintering Out by Seamus Heaney; North by Seamus Heaney; Notes from the Land of the Dead and Other Poems by Thomas Kinsella; The Snow Party by Derek Mahon; High Island by Richard Murphy.” The Sewanee Review 84 (1976): 199–208.
 Denman, Peter. “Archaeologies of Love: New Selected Poems by Richard Murphy; The Mirror Wall by Richard Murphy.” The Poetry Ireland Review 26 (1989): 55–59.
 Greacen, Robert. “Echoes from the Big House: The Price of Stone by Richard Murphy; A Celibate Affair by Padraig J. Daly; Up the Leg of Your Jacket by Pat Ingoldsby.” Books Ireland 97 (1985): 169
 Greacen, Robert. “Conventional Rebel” Books Ireland 251 (2002): 202–204.
 Grennan, Eamon. “Riddling Free: The Price of Stone by Richard Murphy” The Poetry Ireland Review 15 (1985/1986): 10–16.
 Hammill, Brendan. “Darkness Brightening: New Selected Poems by Richard Murphy; The Mirror Wall by Richard Murphy; Selected: Poems by Eavan Boland; Witch in the Bushes by Rita Ann Higgins; Home Movie Nights by Sara Berkeley; The Hanged Man Was Not Surrendering by Macdara Woods.” Books Ireland 142 (1990): 109
 Harmon, Maurice. “High Island by Richard Murphy; Out of My Time. Poems 1967–1974 by John Hewitt; Rhyming Weavers and Other Country Poets of Antrim and Down by John Hewitt; The Wearing of the Black. An Anthology of Contemporary Ulster Poetry by Padraic Fiacc.” Irish University Review 5 (1975): 201–202.
 Hoffman, Daniel. “Constraints and Self-Determinations: Blue Juniata: Collected Poems by Malcolm Cowley; White-Haired Lover by Karl Shapiro; The Last Day and the First by Theodore Weiss; Selected Poems by Robin Skelton; The Collected Poems of Anne Wilkinson and a Prose Memoir by Anne Wilkinson; A. J. M. Smith; The Battle of Aughrim by Richard Murphy.” Poetry 114 (1969): 335–344.
 Johnston, Fred. “Rooting out the Rural Protestant Windows by Sam Gardiner; Decoding Samara by Patrick Deeley; A Wrenboy's Carnival: Poems 1980–2000 by Gabriel Fitzmaurice; Collected Poems by Richard Murphy.” Books Ireland 236 (2000): 354–355.
 Johnstone, Robert. “Living in the Real World: West Strand Visions by James Simmons; Living Room by Andrew Waterman; High Island by Richard Murphy.” Fortnight 96 (1975): 15.
 King, Patrick. “High Island by Richard Murphy.” Studies: An Irish Quarterly Review 65 (1976): 80–82.
 Leddy, Michael. “Collected Poems, 1952–2000 by Richard Murphy.” World Literature Today 75 (2001): 155–156.
 Mahony, Christina Hunt. “Collected Poems 1952–2012 by Richard Murphy.” The Canadian Journal of Irish Studies 27/28 (2001/2002): 149–150.
 Martine, Augustine. “Island Lyrics by Kevin Faller; Sailing to an Island by Richard Murphy; Lady and Gentlemanby Richard Weber; A Garland for the Green by Ewart Milne; Esau My Kingdom for a Drinkby James Liddy; The Astronomy of Love by Jon Stallworthy; Flame in the Dark by Anthony Naumann; Verge of Eden by Mae Winkler Goodman.” Studies: An Irish Quarterly Review 53 (1964): 95–99.
 McDonald, Peter. “Chalk and Cheese: New Selected Poems by Richard Murphy; The Mirror Wall by Richard Murphy; Blood and Family by Thomas Kinsella.” The Irish Review 7 (1989): 92–97.
 Payne, Basil. “Special Review – New Poetry: The Battle of Aughrim by Richard Murphy; Night Crossing by Derek Mahon; Collected Poems 1932–67 by John Hewitt; The Dying Gaul by Desmond O'Grady; Driving to Biloxi by Edgar Simmons; Life Studies by Robert Lowell” Studies: An Irish Quarterly Review 58 (1969): 74–78.
 Reynolds, Lorna. “Sailing to an Island by Richard Murphy” University Review 3 (1964): 60–61.
 Simmons, James. “Poetry Miscellany: How to Put the Love Back into Making Love by Dagmar O'Connor; The Creationists by Andrew Elliott; Blood and Family by Thomas Kinsella; The Mirror Wall by Richard Murphy; Castle Corner by Joyce Cary.” The Linen Hall Review 6 (1989): 30–31.
 Quinn, Justin. “The Weather of Irish Poetry: Selected Poems by Ciaran Carson; The Weather in Japan by Michael Longley; Shelmalier by Medbh McGuckian; Smashing the Piano by John Montague; Collected Poems 1952–2000 by Richard Murphy; Seatown and Earlier Poems by Conor O'Callaghan” The Sewanee Review 111 (2003): 486–492.
Skloot, Floyd. “Collected Poems 1952–2000 by Richard Murphy” Harvard Review 23 (2002):171–173.

1927 births
2018 deaths
Irish poets
Fellows of the Royal Society of Literature
Aosdána members
People from County Mayo
People from County Galway